Accius was a Latin poet of the 16th century.

Accius may also refer to:

 Accia (gens), a Roman family from Pisaurum
 Cesare Antonio Accius, early 17th century engraver
 Lerema accius, butterfly commonly known as Clouded Skipper
 Lucius Accius, Roman tragic poet born in 170 BC
 Titus Accius, prosecutor in the murder trial of Aulus Cluentius Habitus
 Operation ACCIUS, Canadian military contribution to the civilian-led United Nations Assistance Mission in Afghanistan